Stephen Paul Lamacq (born 16 October 1964), sometimes known by his nickname Lammo (given to him by John Peel), is an English disc jockey, currently working with the BBC radio station BBC Radio 6 Music.

Early life
He attended The Ramsey Academy from 1976, which had been formed the previous year from two grammar schools. He was brought up in the Essex village of Colne Engaine.

Early career
He cites Orchestral Manoeuvres in the Dark's "wonderful" 1979 single "Electricity" as his inspiration to become a disc jockey, noting that he wanted to afford air time to similar, "curious" music. Prior to launching this career, he studied Journalism at Harlow College, Essex, and worked as a junior reporter at the West Essex Gazette. In similar fashion to other music journalists who started fanzines during their teenage years, Lamacq started one called A Pack of Lies.

During his time at NME he began DJing on the pirate radio station Q102, which would become XFM. He formed a record label in 1992 with Alan James and Tony Smith, called Deceptive Records. The majority of the label's releases shared a punk-pop sensibility, with Elastica being their most successful signing, before the label eventually folded in 2001.

Between 1995 and 1997, Lamacq occasionally presented Top of the Pops on BBC One with fellow Radio 1 DJ Jo Whiley.

In a 1996 Peel session by Mogwai, the fourth item on the track listing is Mogwai Salute the brilliance of Steve Lamacq.

Lamacq is a fan of Colchester United. He visited their training ground for his 50th birthday where he trained as a goalkeeper, has written an autobiography, entitled Going Deaf for a Living and has also acted as a compere on the main stage at the Reading Festival on several occasions.

BBC Radio

In the early 1990s, Lamacq appeared regularly on the Gary Crowley show, a three-hour Sunday afternoon indie music programme  on the BBC station GLR. Lamacq contributed the Gig Guide and the NME Indie Top 20.

Radio 1
Between 1993 and 1997 Lamacq presented The Evening Session with Jo Whiley, and then on his own until December 2002, when the programme was cancelled. Colin Murray served as a temporary replacement for six months until Zane Lowe's contract with the London station XFM ended in June 2003, where he took up a permanent position.  On 28 September 2007, both he and Whiley reunited to recreate The Evening Session on the latter's show as part of Radio 1's 40th Anniversary celebrations.

He also presented the indie radio show Lamacq Live every Monday evening, beginning in July 1998 and ending on 18 September 2006. The show ended as part of a makeover in Radio 1's schedule to present a "younger image" to Radio One listeners, with Colin Murray taking over his slot.

Lamacq has also presented documentaries for the station, as well as hosting their John Peel Night special. He presented the In New Music We Trust programme every Monday night from 9 to 10pm until August 2009, when it was announced he would be leaving Radio 1 as part of a shakeup in the scheduling.

6 Music
Lamacq's homepage on the 6 Music website described Lamacq Live as "the UK's most influential indie radio show". He also has a programme on the BBC's digital station, BBC Radio 6 Music, which was on Sunday afternoons, but from April 2005 he has presented the daily teatime show on BBC Radio 6 Music, taking over from Andrew Collins, where he still remains.

In March 2010 it was announced that Lamacq and fellow Radio 1 presenter Jo Whiley would present a one-off Evening Session (the first in 13 years) on Good Friday (2 April) for BBC Radio 6 Music.

In 2016, Lamacq broadcast from the studios at BBC Radio Humberside, as part of Radio 6 Music's Independent Venue Week tour. One night of the nationwide tour was hosted at The New Adelphi Club in Hull, East Yorkshire, on 26 January 2016, with Mark Morriss as the headline act.

Radio 2
In addition to his regular 6 Music slot, he also presented a weekly show on BBC Radio 2 where he played his own choice of music and introduces his listeners to both new and emerging artists.

Beginning in April 2007, the show was originally broadcast on Wednesdays between 11:30pm and 12:30am and, from April 2008, between 11pm and 12am. At Easter 2010, as part of wider changes to the Radio 2 evening schedule, Trevor Nelson took over the Wednesday 11pm slot (having previously been on in the hour before Lamacq), with Lamacq moving to 11pm on Saturday nights. In April 2012, the show was renamed Steve Lamacq's Rock College and moved to a Thursday 11pm slot.

In 2007, he deputised for Bob Harris on Saturdays from 11pm to 2am, who had to receive treatment for cancer. As a result of Lamacq's move to Saturdays, Harris' show now airs from midnight to 3am.

Lamacq left regular presenting duties on Radio 2 in September 2013 as part of a reshuffle of evening presenters, but will return in the future as a presenter of one-off shows and as a stand-in for other presenters.

5Live
Lamacq has appeared as a guest on 5live sport punditry show Fighting Talk hosted by Colin Murray. His appearances have been a highlight on the show.

Weekenders mix album
Weekenders is a DJ mix album mixed by Steve Lamacq and released by London Records in 1996. It has a dance and indie-alternative rock feel rolled into one with Britpop tracks such as Pulp's "Common People" and Blur's "Girls & Boys" alongside tracks by electronica artists such as The Chemical Brothers, Prodigy and Orbital.

References

External links

Steve Lamacq (BBC Radio 6 Music)
Steve Lamacq's Roundtable (BBC Radio 6 Music)

1964 births
Alumni of Harlow College
BBC Radio 1 presenters
BBC Radio 6 Music presenters
Living people
English music journalists
English radio DJs
NME writers
Melody Maker writers
People from Islington (district)
Pirate radio personalities
People from Braintree District